Casa Grande Hotel may refer to:

Casa Grande Hotel (Casa Grande, Arizona), listed on the National Register of Historic Places in Pinal County, Arizona
Casa Grande Hotel (Elk City, Oklahoma), listed on the National Register of Historic Places in Beckham County, Oklahoma

See also
 Casa Grande (disambiguation)